The Choral Temple is a synagogue located in Bucharest, Romania.  Designed by Enderle and Freiwald and built between 1864 - 1866, it is a very close copy of Vienna's Leopoldstadt-Tempelgasse Great Synagogue, which had been built in 1855–1858. The synagogue was devastated by the far-right Legionaries, but was then restored after World War II, in 1945. The main hall was recently refurbished, and re-opened in 2015. The synagogue is still hosts daily religious services in the small hall, being one of the few active synagogues in the city and in Romania.

Bibliography

See also
 History of the Jews in Romania
 List of synagogues in Romania

Synagogues in Bucharest
Historic monuments in Bucharest
Synagogues completed in 1866
1866 establishments in Romania
Moorish Revival synagogues
19th-century architecture in Romania